Redvan Memeshev (born 15 August 1993) is a professional Ukrainian football forward of Crimean Tatar origin.

Career
Memeshev attended the Sport school of FC Krymteplytsia Molodizhne. He played for the senior FC Krymteplytsia's team in the Ukrainian Premier League and in summer 2013 signed a contract with FC Volyn. Memeshev made his debut for FC Volyn Lutsk played the full-time in the game against FC Dynamo Kyiv on 14 July 2013 in Ukrainian Premier League.

References

External links 
 
 
 
 Profile at Crimean Football Union

1993 births
Living people
Ukrainian people of Crimean Tatar descent
Crimean Tatar sportspeople
People from Dzhankoy
Ukrainian footballers
Association football forwards
Ukrainian expatriate footballers
Expatriate footballers in Belarus
Ukrainian expatriate sportspeople in Belarus
Expatriate footballers in Kazakhstan
Ukrainian expatriate sportspeople in Kazakhstan
Ukrainian Premier League players
FC Krymteplytsia Molodizhne players
FC Volyn Lutsk players
FC Karpaty Lviv players
SC Dnipro-1 players
FC Slavia Mozyr players
Crimean Premier League players